Mang Ke (芒克, original name Jiang Shiwei), born in 1951, is a prominent Chinese poet and co-founder (with Bei Dao) of the underground literary journal Jintian (Today), which appeared irregularly between 1978 and 1980 before being shut down by the Chinese Government.

Considered a member of the Misty Poets, Mang Ke's works were never officially recognized and appeared primarily as photocopies.

Mang Ke is also an accomplished painter.

Interviews
In 2015, he was interviewed by the Franco-Chinese online channel CAP33.

References

External links

1951 births
Living people
Artists from Shenyang
Writers from Shenyang
Misty poets
Poets from Liaoning
Painters from Liaoning
Chinese magazine founders